Josetxo Grieta is a noise rock band formed in Bilbao in 2006. The members are Josetxo Anitua from the band Cancer Moon, Iñigo Eguillor from Gringo, and Mattin from Billy Bao, Deflag Haemorrhage/Haien Kontra, Sakada, and NMM. Josetxo Grieta publishes their music under the no-licence of Anti-copyright.

Discography
Reminder of a Precious Life CDr (Audiobot, Antwerpen, 2006)
Euskal Semea CD ( w.m.o/r, Berlin 2006)

External links
Josetxo Grieta official website

Noise rock groups

Spanish musical groups
Spanish rock music groups